Vladimir III Igorevich (October 8, 1170Putyvl,  1211) was a Rus' prince (a member of the Rurik dynasty). He was the son of Igor Svyatoslavich and was with him during his campaign against the Cumans on 13 April 1185, immortalized in the epic The Tale of Igor's Campaign; he participated in the first battle, wherein he set off ahead of the main group along with Svyatoslav Olgovich of Rylsk and defeated the Cuman forces. However, he was captured in the second battle by Khans Gzak and Konchak. The Tale of Igor’s Campaign describes how, after Igor escaped from captivity, Gzak and Konchak debated whether to kill Vladimir or entice him into marrying a Cuman maiden:

The Tale of Igor’s Campaign ends with Vladimir still captive to the khans. In the autumn of 1188, he returned home from captivity with Khan Konchak’s daughter Svoboda. Soon after, on 26 September, Rurik Rostislavich organized festivities to celebrate Vladimir’s wedding to Svoboda, attended by the rest of his family.

Marriage and children
c. 1188: Svoboda, a daughter of Khan Konchak of the Donets Cumans
Prince Izyaslav Vladimirovich ( 1188 1255) of Putivl;
Prince Vsevolod Vladimirovich ( 1188 1210).

Ancestors

Footnotes

Sources
Benda, Kálmán (General Editor): Magyarország történeti kronológiája - I. kötet: A kezdetektől 1526-ig /A Historical Chronology of Hungary - Volume I: From the Beginnings to 1526/; Akadémiai Kiadó, 1981, Budapest;  (the part of the book which describes the events of the period from 1197 to 1309 was written by László Solymosi).
Dimnik, Martin: The Dynasty of Chernigov - 1146-1246; Cambridge University Press, 2003, Cambridge; .

Olgovichi family
Princes of Halych
People from Sumy Oblast
1170 births
13th-century deaths